Bigg Boss OTT (or Bigg Boss OTT Kannada) is a spin-off Indian Kannada-language reality digital series of the show Bigg Boss that airs exclusively on Viacom 18's streaming service platform Voot. The digital edition hosted by Sudeep and the show premiered its first season on 6 August 2022.

Concept 
As with the television series, the group of contestants referred to as Housemates are enclosed in the Bigg Boss House under constant surveillance of cameras and microphones. The winner of Bigg Boss OTT will receive ₹5 lakh and the "OTT edition" 

The show is a 24/7 non stop show and also it have 1 hour daily episode on Voot like the original edition.

Development 
The spin-off edition was officially announced on 22 July 2022, Voot unveiled a poster and teaser with Sudeep as the host of this digital exclusive season.

Broadcasts 
There was no television coverage for this edition; instead, it would be completely streamed online at Voot for 24×7 coverage.

House 
The location for the house set to remain at Innovative Film City, Bengaluru like how it did for the original series. The house contains a living area, One large bedroom, kitchen, garden, bathroom, store room, smoking room and jail (for punishment purposes only). The house also contains a confession room where contestants speak private matters to Bigg Boss. Bigg Boss OTT Kannada (Season 1)

Series overview

Housemate Summary

  Champion
  Finalist
  Top Performer of the Season.

References

External links 

Bigg Boss Kannada
Indian reality television series
2022 Indian television series debuts
Colors Kannada original programming